The Alfredo di Braccio Award is a prestigious prize for young Italian scientists given by the Italian Accademia Nazionale dei Lincei.

Award winners

Every year a top young chemist or physicist receives this honor for their research.

 2008 Chemistry prize was awarded to Lorenzo Malavasi (University of Pavia, Italy)
 2009 Physics prize was awarded (ex aequo) to Alessandro Mirizzi (University of Bari, Italy) and Alessio Recati (CNR Trento, Italy)
 2010 Chemistry prize was awarded to Riccardo Baron (CSV Health, USA)
 2011 Physics prize was awarded (ex aequo) to Antonio Politano (University of Calabria, Italy) and Alessandro Giuliani (Roma Tre University, Italy)
 2012 Chemistry prize was awarded to Tiziano Montini (University of Trieste, Italy)
 2013 Physics prize was awarded (ex aequo) to Francesco Pellegrino (University of Catania, Italy) and Pasquale Serpico (CNRS, France)
 2014 Physics prize was awarded to Stefano Protti (University of Pavia)
 2015 Physics prize was awarded (ex aequo) to Filippo Caruso (University of Florence, Italy), Michele Cicoli (University of Bologna, Italy), and Alessandro Pitanti (CNR Pisa, Italy)
 2016 Chemistry prize was awarded to Francesca Maria Toma (Lawrence Berkeley National Laboratory, Italy)
 2017 Physics prize was awarded to Marco Genoni (University of Milan, Italy)
 2018 Chemistry prize was awarded to Lorenzo Mino (University of Turin, Italy)
 2019 Physics prize awarded (ex aequo) to Matteo Lucchini and Andrea Crespi (Polytechnic University of Milan, Italy), and Lorenzo Rovigatti (University of Rome "La Sapienza", Italy)
 2020 Chemistry prize was awarded to Raffaele Cucciniello (University of Salerno, Italy)
 2021 Physics prize was awarded (ex aequo) to Eleonora Di Valentino (Durham University, UK) and Sunny Vagnozzi (University of Cambridge, UK)

See also

 List of chemistry awards
 List of physics awards

References

Chemistry awards
Physics awards
Italian science and technology awards